Ghizlane Chebbak (born 19 February 1991) is a Moroccan professional footballer who plays as a forward for ASFAR and the Morocco women's national team. She was named the player of the tournament in the 2022 Africa Women Cup of Nations.

Club career
Chebbak has played for ASFAR in Morocco.

International career
Chebbak capped for Morocco at senior level during the 2018 Africa Women Cup of Nations qualification (first round).

International goals
Scores and results list Morocco's goal tally first

Personal life
Chebbak's father, Larbi Chebbak, was also an international footballer.

Honor
 IFFHS Africa Team of The Year: 2022

See also
List of Morocco women's international footballers

References

External links

1991 births
Living people
Moroccan women's footballers
Women's association football forwards
Morocco women's international footballers